Colobothea humerosa is a species of beetle in the family Cerambycidae. It was described by Bates in 1865. It is known from Brazil and Ecuador.

References

humerosa
Beetles described in 1865